Diego Oliveira may refer to:
Diego Oliveira (footballer, born 1987), Brazilian footballer
Diego Oliveira (footballer, born 1990), Brazilian footballer
Diego Ângelo de Oliveira (born 1986), Brazilian footballer
Diego Gama de Oliveira (born 1983), Brazlian footballer